The Audubon Society of Portland is a non-profit environmental organization dedicated to wildlife conservancy in Portland, Oregon, United States.

Founded in 1902 and incorporated in 1909, it is one of the oldest such organizations in the world.
It is named in honor of John James Audubon, an ornithologist and naturalist who painted, cataloged, and described birds of North America in Birds of America published in sections between 1827 and 1838.

The society owns  of woodland adjacent to Forest Park, managed as a nature sanctuary and features indigenous vegetation and fauna, including a small stand of old growth timber.  The sanctuary is open to the public for free.
Much of the sanctuary surrounds Balch Creek

Within the sanctuary is a nature center containing classrooms, retail store, wildlife taxidermy exhibits, auditorium, and a wildlife care center.  The care center treats injured and orphaned native wildlife utilizing professional staff and more than one hundred volunteers. More than 3,500 animals are brought to the center each year.

 Displays of live educational birds are adjacent to the care center.  Five birds are on display, having injuries or imprinting that prevent them from successful reintroduction to the wild. Currently there is a Great Horned Owl, male and female American Kestrels, and a Turkey Vulture. There is also a Western Painted Turtle that was rescued from a pet store and now lives in a tank inside the Care Center. 

In 2007, there were 21,615 hours volunteered to the society's efforts, including visitor reception, trail maintenance, tour guides, nature store attendant, clerical, conservation activists, and wildlife caretakers.  It is one of the most highly rated charities of its kind, based on operational and organizational efficiency.

The society is frequently consulted for expertise related to practical wildlife questions
and wildlife management practices.

History 
Portland birders created the John Burroughs Club in 1898.  In 1901, birders in Astoria—Oregon's second largest city at the time—formed the Oregon Audubon Society.  In 1902 the Portland group merged with them as Oregon Audubon Society.  The named changed to Audubon Society of Portland in 1966 when members agreed to affiliate with the National Audubon Society.

The society has long conducted letter writing campaigns to influence legislation.
They helped pass the Model Bird Law in 1903, protecting native birds from being shot and sold.
A 1925 letter writing campaign to President Calvin Coolidge successfully led to creation of Hart Mountain Antelope Refuge.
The society takes credit for helping to establish several national refuges, including William L. Finley NWR, Three Arch Rocks NWR, Klamath NWR, Ankeny NWR, Baskett Slough NWR, and Malheur NWR.

See also
 List of Oregon birds
 Chapman swifts, a migratory flock which roosts each autumn in a grade school chimney maintained by the Audubon Society of Portland

References

External links
 Audubon Society of Portland - official site

1902 establishments in Oregon
Portland
Clubs and societies in Oregon
Nature centers in Oregon
Organizations based in Portland, Oregon
Parks in Portland, Oregon
Tourist attractions in Portland, Oregon